The Łukta is a river flowing through the village of Łukta, a tributary of the Marąg river. Its average flow rate is 0.36 m³ per second. The river has been assigned the second class of water cleanliness.

Rivers of Poland
Rivers of Warmian-Masurian Voivodeship
2Łukta